Felix Kammerer is an Austrian actor. He made his big screen debut in the 2022 German language adaptation of All Quiet on the Western Front, playing Paul Bäumer, the main character and central figure of the story.

Early and personal life
His parents are the opera singers Angelika Kirchschlager and Hans Peter Kammerer. From 2015 to 2019, he studied at the Ernst Busch Academy of Dramatic Arts in Berlin.

Career
Kammerer's stage work includes performances at the Maxim Gorki Theater in Berlin and at the Salzburg Festival before joining the ensemble at the Burgtheater in Vienna in 2019, for which he was reportedly handpicked by dramaturge Sabrina Zwach. In 2022 he made his big screen debut appearing as Paul Bäumer, the lead role in Edward Berger’s German-language adaptation of the Erich Maria Remarque 1928 novel All Quiet on the Western Front. Berger was casting for the role of Bäumer when Kammerer was identified by Sabrina Zwach, wife of the film’s producer, Malte Grunert. Grunert was so impressed by Kammerer’s performance at the Burgtheater he offered him an immediate audition and gave a personal recommendation to Berger. Berger described seeing Kammerer’s face the first time and being struck by the fact he “was already so old-fashioned and so classic looking, so pure and so innocent”. They continued to cast for four to five months and Berger said:

Kammerer's performance has been widely praised by Maggie Lovitt for Collider saying "In his first performance on-screen, Kammerer proves himself as a promising newcomer on the global stage. Paul Bäumer is not an easy role to take on; the physicality of the role alone might crush a performer, and that's without considering the great emotional toll undertaken to portray the shame, depravity, and agony of war. Paul is the heart of the film, and Kammerer effortlessly bares his soul to the audience as the war takes and takes and takes from his character." John Nugent of Empire (magazine) described his performance as "hugely impactful even when caked in mud". Danny Leigh in The Financial Times describes him as a "remarkable newcomer", with Kate Connolly in The Guardian describing how “Bäumer is tenderly and brilliantly played by newcomer Felix Kammerer”. Justin Chang for IGN says "Kammerer may be a newcomer, but his performance is nuanced and chilling in equal measures. Bäumer isn't just out of his depth – each and every moment of life on the front lines leaves him desperately trying to catch his breath. Kammerer captures every moment with an agonizing depth that he wears on his sleeve throughout. This truly incredible performance highlights the horror of a young soldier forced to confront every nightmare imaginable. Bäumer is under the lens, as every moment pushes him further away from the young man he was."

Awards
For his portrayal of Luke in Mosquitoes by Lucy Kirkwood at the Akademietheater in Vienna, he was awarded the Nestroy in the Best Young Male category at the Nestroy Theatre Awards in 2022. In January 2023, it was announced Kammerer was included on the longlist in the best actor category for the 76th British Academy of Film and Television Arts awards.

Filmography

References

1995 births
Living people
Austrian actors